Hearts in San Francisco is an annual public art installation started in 2004 by the San Francisco General Hospital Foundation for the purpose of fundraising. The project is inspired by the international CowParade exhibit, in which cow sculptures are painted by various artists and installed in various cities throughout the world. The choice of hearts is inspired by the Tony Bennett song "I Left My Heart in San Francisco."

Background
Each year, uniform heart sculptures are painted by different artists and installed at locations throughout San Francisco, including Union Square. The heart sculptures are auctioned off at the end of each year's installation with the proceeds going to the foundation. Many of the previous years' sculptures are exhibited in various locations, including San Francisco City Hall, San Francisco General Hospital, San Francisco International Airport, AT&T Park (inside the Public House pub), Pier 39, the Lyon Street Steps, Moscone Center, and the Cartoon Art Museum.  As of 2013, approximately $10 million had been raised for the foundation.

Notable contributing artists have included Mark Adams, Don Asmussen, Tony Bennett, Squeak Carnwath, Alan Chin, Roy De Forest, Linda Fleming, Phil Frank, Tim Gaskin, Mildred Howard, Norman Korpi, Jon Langford, Hung Liu, Kara Maria, Silvia Poloto, Stan Dann, Precita Eyes Muralists, Rex Ray, Rigo 23, Bill Russell, Monika Steiner, Laurel True, and Eric Zener.

References

External links

Union Square, San Francisco
Culture of San Francisco